The Justice Party of Denmark was founded in 1919 as an association and transformed into a political party in 1922. The party's platform is based upon the principles of U.S. economist Henry George - who advocated a single tax on all land - and those of Danish moral philosopher Severin Christensen.

The party was elected to parliament for the first time in 1926, and they were moderately successful in the post-war period and managed to join a governing coalition with the Social Democrats and the Social Liberal Party from the years 1957–60. In 1960 they dropped out of the parliament. However in the 1973 Danish parliamentary election (the so-called Landslide Election) the party won 5 seats in Folketinget, because of their opposition to Danish membership of the European Economic Community. They lost their seats in the next election in 1975, but regained representation in 1977 and were represented until 1981. They also had a seat in the European Parliament 1978–79 (by Ib Christensen).

The 1970s were followed by a dropoff of party support, and the party ceased to run at a national level in 1990, but in 2005 the party ran together with Minoritetspartiet (the Minority Party): this wasn't with any success since the Minority Party only achieved 0.3% of the votes. They have decided to try to collect the 20 000 signatures necessary to participate in the next election to the Folketing.

They have also adopted a new communication strategy with four main policies: Danish exit from the EU, a better environmental policy, a humanitarian refugee and immigration policy and a tax reform with a 6% land tax financing a lower income tax and a reduction of the VAT on basic commodities from 25% to 12.5%. Their youth organization Retsforbundets Ungdom has been reinvigorated.

Election results

Parliament (Folketing)

Municipal elections

Regional elections

External links 
Party website

Eurosceptic parties in Denmark
Political parties established in 1919
Georgist parties
1919 establishments in Denmark